Forrest Goodwin (June 14, 1862 – May 28, 1913) was a United States representative from Maine.  He was born in Skowhegan, Maine and attended the common schools, graduated from Skowhegan High School and Bloomfield Academy.  He also graduated from Colby College and Boston University Law School.  He was admitted to the bar in 1889 and commenced practice in Skowhegan.

He was elected a member of the Maine House of Representatives in 1889. He was appointed clerk at the Speaker's table under Speaker Thomas B. Reed in the Fifty-first Congress, was elected a member of the Maine State Senate 1903–1905, and served as its president in 1905.

He was elected as a Republican to the Sixty-third Congress and served from March 4, 1913, until his death in Portland, Maine May 28, 1913.  His interment was in South Side Cemetery, Skowhegan.

See also
List of United States Congress members who died in office (1900–49)

References

1862 births
1913 deaths
People from Skowhegan, Maine
Colby College alumni
Boston University School of Law alumni
Maine lawyers
Republican Party members of the United States House of Representatives from Maine
19th-century American politicians
19th-century American lawyers